Şebnem Dönmez (born May 17, 1974 in Salzgitter, West Germany)  is a Turkish movie, television series actress and host of television shows.

Originally a model, she debuted in 1992 at the television scene taking part in a motorsports show of TRT, at that time Turkey's only channel. Şebnem Dönmez kept on appearing in and hosting several TV shows since then.

She acted in a stream of Turkish films and television series. The first international movie she acted in was The Net 2.0, a Hollywood production shot in Istanbul. She performed on stage with one of the leading roles in Oyunun Oyunu (Noises Off) by Michael Frayn.

In 2005, she married the film director Ezel Akay. Their marriage ended after two years.

Filmography

Film

Television series

Television programs

Theatre

References

External links
 Official website

1974 births
Turkish film actresses
Turkish television presenters
German people of Turkish descent
People from Salzgitter
Living people
20th-century Turkish actresses
Turkish women television presenters